

Incumbents
President: José Eduardo dos Santos
Prime Minister: Fernando José de França Dias Van-Dúnem (until December 2), Marcolino Moco

Events
March 24 - United Nations Security Council Resolution 747 to enlarge United Nations Angola Verification Mission II
August 27 - abolition of the People's Republic of Angola and creation of the Republic of Angola
September 29–30: 1992 Angolan general election
October 30 - November 1: Halloween Massacre, also known as the Three Day War.
November 30 - United Nations Security Council Resolution 793 to extend the mandate of the United Nations Angola Verification Mission II

Births

Deaths
November 1 - Aliceres Mango
November 2
Jeremias Chitunda
Elias Salupeto Pena

References

 
1990s in Angola
Years of the 20th century in Angola
Angola